William Fraser Martin (1834 – 25 October 1917) was a Scottish-born Australian politician.

He was born in Inverness to farmer William Martin and Elizabeth Fraser. The family moved to New South Wales around 1837 and became farmers. Martin followed the gold rushes through New South Wales and Victoria before becoming a farmer in 1859. On 28 April 1859 he married Mary McFarlane, with whom he had two sons. He moved to Sydney to work as a land agent, and in 1880 was elected to the New South Wales Legislative Assembly for West Sydney. He was defeated in 1882, but returned to the Assembly in 1887 as the member for Shoalhaven. He did not contest the 1889 election. Martin died at Redfern in 1917.

References

 

1834 births
1917 deaths
Members of the New South Wales Legislative Assembly
Free Trade Party politicians
British emigrants to Australia